Major Command or Major Commands are large formations of the United States Armed Forces. Historically, a Major Command is the highest level of command. Within the United States Army, the acronym MACOM is used for Major Command. Within the United States Air Force, the acronym MAJCOM is used.

There are several types of Major Commands in the United States military:
List of Major Commands of the United States Air Force
List of Major Commands of the United States Army
Naval Education and Training Command of the United States Navy

References 

Commands of the United States Armed Forces